Jodhpur (Rajasthan) is the second largest city in the Indian state of Rajasthan. Jodhpur has one of the largest concentrations of universities and higher education institutions.

Universities
 Maulana Azad University, Jodhpur
 Agriculture University, Jodhpur
 Dr. Sarvepalli Radhakrishnan Rajasthan Ayurved University
 Jai Narain Vyas University
 Jodhpur National University
 Sardar Patel University of Police, Security and Criminal Justice

Higher education colleges

 Indian Institute of Technology Jodhpur 
 All India Institute of Medical Sciences Jodhpur
 National Law University, Jodhpur
 National Institute of Fashion Technology
 Indian Institute of Handloom Technology
 MBM Engineering College
 Dr. S.N. Medical College
 Jodhpur Institute of Engineering & Technology
 Vyas Institutes of Higher Education
 S.L.B.S Engineering College
 Mayurakshi Institute of Engineering & Technology
 Raj Engineering College
 Marwar Engineering College & Research Centre 
 Onkarmal Somani College of Commerce
 Lachoo Memorial College of Science & Technology
 Aishwarya College of Education
 State institute of hotel management

See also
Arid Forest Research Institute (AFRI) Jodhpur
Rajasthan Technical University
Jodhpur National University

References

3.

Jodhpur
Jodhpur